Sardul Singh Guraya (1930–2012) was an Indian biologist, known for his contributions in the fields of reproductive physiology and Developmental biology. He was an elected fellow of the Indian National Science Academy, National Academy of Sciences, India and National Academy of Agricultural Sciences. The Council of Scientific and Industrial Research, the apex agency of the Government of India for scientific research, awarded him the Shanti Swarup Bhatnagar Prize for Science and Technology, one of the highest Indian science awards, in 1973, for his contributions to biological sciences.

Biography 
Sardul Singh Guraya was born on 12 October 1930 to Banta Singh Guraya and Nihal Kaur at Kotmajlis village in Gurdaspur district of the Punjab state in the British India. He graduated in science (BSc hons) in 1954 from Punjab University from where he also obtained his master's (MSc) and doctoral (PhD) degrees in 1956 and 1959 respectively and started his career as an assistant professor at Gorakhpur University in 1960. Two years later, he moved to the US and did his post doctoral studies at the Population Council from 1962 to 1964. Returning to India in 1965, he joined the Council of Scientific and Industrial Research as a pool officer and stayed at the council for one year till he returned to academics as the reader of Mohanlal Sukhadia University (then known as Udaipur University) in 1966. His next move was as a professor to Punjab Agricultural University in 1971 where he served out his career till his superannuation in 1992; in between, holding the positions of the dean of the College of Basic Sciences and Humanities and of the director of Advance Regional Research Center in Reproductive Biology (an Indian Council of Medical Research sponsored initiative) from 1982 to 1991. During the course of his career, he secured a Doctor Science degree from Punjab University, Chandigarh in 1971.

Guraya was married to Surinder Kaur and the couple had two sons and a daughter. He died on 8 July 2012, at the age of 81.

Legacy 
Guraya was known to have done pioneering research on genetical divergence of crops with different breeding systems which inaugurated a new school of thought on the subject. His studies dealt with the correlation between the structure and function of reproductive organs and elucidated its evolutionary aspects, with special emphasis on the ovarian and testicular compartments. His findings on the developmental traits of crops was reported to have assisted in crop improvement with regard to disease resistance, productivity and grain quality. He published his research findings in several articles and over 10 books; PubMed, an online article repository has listed 215 of his articles. His body of work includes The Cell and Molecular Biology of Fish Oogenesis, Cellular and Molecular Biology of Gonadal Development and Maturation in Mammals: Fundamentals and Biomedical Implications, Comparative Cellular and Molecular Biology of Ovary in Mammals: Fundamental and Applied Aspects, Comparative Cellular and Molecular Biology of Testis in Vertebrates: Trends in Endocrine, Paracrine, and Autocrine Regulation of Structure and Functions, Cellular And Molecular Biology For Human, (all on Cell and Molecular biology), Biology of Spermatogenesis and Spermatozoa in Mammals, Biology of Spermatogenesis and Spermatozoa in Mammals, Buffalo bull semen: morphology, biochemistry, physiology and methodology (all on spermatogenesis) and Rodents: ecology, biology and control. He was associated with national and international organizations such as World Health Organization, UNESCO, Indian Council of Medical Research, Indian Council of Agricultural Research, Council of Scientific and Industrial Research and the University Grants Commission and served as the member of the council of Indian National Science Academy (INSA) from 1986 to 1988. He was also a member of the editorial boards of Journal of Biosciences, Himalayan Journal of Environment and Zoology and the journals of the INSA.

Awards and honors 
Guraya, who served as the national lecturer of the University Grants Commission from 1971 to 1976, was an emeritus scientist (1992–1996) and a professor emeritus (1996–2000) at the Council of Scientific and Industrial Research. He was awarded the Shanti Swarup Bhatnagar Prize, one of the highest Indian science awards, by the Council of Scientific and Industrial Research in 1973. He received the PAU Prize in 1980, followed by the M. S. Randhawa Award for Best Book in 1985 and the Basanti Devi Amir Chand Prize of Indian Council of Medical Research in 1990. An elected fellow of the National Academy of Sciences, India, he was elected as a fellow by the Indian Academy of Sciences in 1975 and by the Indian National Science Academy in 1980. He was also a fellow of the National Academy of Agricultural Sciences. His biography has been included in the volume 40 of the Biographical memoirs of fellows of the Indian National Science Academy, published by INSA in 2013.

Selected bibliography

Books

Articles

See also 
 Deen Dayal Upadhyay Gorakhpur University
 Panjab University

Notes

References

External links 
 
 
 

Recipients of the Shanti Swarup Bhatnagar Award in Biological Science
1930 births
2012 deaths
Fellows of the Indian Academy of Sciences
Fellows of the Indian National Science Academy
Fellows of The National Academy of Sciences, India
Fellows of the National Academy of Agricultural Sciences
People from Gurdaspur district
Punjabi people
Panjab University alumni
Academic staff of Mohanlal Sukhadia University
Academic staff of Deen Dayal Upadhyay Gorakhpur University
Council of Scientific and Industrial Research
Academic staff of Punjab Agricultural University
World Health Organization officials
UNESCO officials
Indian Council of Medical Research
Indian Council of Agricultural Research
Indian molecular biologists
Indian technology writers
20th-century Indian biologists
Scientists from Punjab, India
21st-century Indian biologists
21st-century Indian non-fiction writers
Indian scientific authors
Indian officials of the United Nations